The Grand Central Chorus are members of the British Association of Barbershop Singers. They are five-time BABS National Chorus Champions.

Contest placement

BHS International 
1998 – 20th
2004 – 18th

BABS National 
Ineligible for one year after each win.

Recordings 
Back On Track – (year)
 On The Right Track – (year)

See also 
 BABS

Notes

External links 
 Official Website

British Association of Barbershop Singers
Barbershop music
British vocal groups